Sundern is a town in the Hochsauerland district, in North Rhine-Westphalia, Germany. The name Sundern is common in Westphalia, as it means "ground given away for private usage" in the Westphalian dialect.

Geography
Around Sundern extends the nature park Homert which attracts tourists, many from the Netherlands. Winter tourism is also substantial, primarily in the municipality Wildewiese with its skiing area. The Sorpesee, an artificial lake, is used by watersportsmen, campers and fishermen.

Neighbouring municipalities

Division of the town
Sundern consists of 16 Ortschaften (subdivisions):

 Allendorf
 Altenhellefeld
 Amecke
 Endorf
 Enkhausen
 Hachen
 Hagen
 Hellefeld
 Hövel
 Langscheid
 Linnepe
 Meinkenbracht
 Stemel 
 Stockum
 Sundern
 Westenfeld

International relations

Sundern is twinned with:
  Benet (France)
  Schirgiswalde (Germany)
  Torfou (France)

Architectural structures
 Schomberg Observation Tower

Industry
The main industries of Sundern are several domestic and industrial lighting companies, household appliances and packaging businesses.
SEVERIN Elektrogeräte GmbH has its headquarters in Sundern.

Notable people
William Danne, actor
Joseph Machalke, priest
Andrea Renzullo, singer and finalist in season 4 of "Das Supertalent"
Heinrich Luebke, German President from 1959 to 1969, born in Enkhausen

References

External links

Official site 

Hochsauerlandkreis